Lowell Catholic is a private, not-for-profit, college preparatory school in Lowell, Massachusetts. It is located in the Roman Catholic Archdiocese of Boston and is a Xaverian Brothers Sponsored School.

Lowell Catholic High School was established in 1989 through the merger of the following other Catholic high schools:
Keith Hall/Keith Catholic
Keith Academy (photo)
St. Patrick's High School
St. Joseph's High School
St. Louis Academy
It enrolls boys and girls in grades Pre-K through 12. The school's philosophy embraces the teachings and principles of the Roman Catholic Church and the Xaverian Brothers Sponsored Schools.

Athletics
Lowell Catholic High School's Athletic teams, the Lowell Catholic Crusaders, participate in the following athletics:

Fall Sports
 Cross Country (Boys' and Girls')
 Football
 Golf
 Soccer (Boys' and Girls')
 Volleyball (Girls')
 Cheerleading (Fall and Winter)
Winter Sports
 Basketball (Boys' and Girls')
 Gymnastics (Boys' and Girls')
 Ice Hockey
 Track
Spring Sports
 Baseball
 Girls' Lacrosse
 Boys' Lacrosse
 Softball
 Tennis (Boys' and Girls')
 Volleyball (Boys')

Notable alumni

 Shelagh Donohoe, Olympic rower 
 Tami Gouveia, State Representative
 Corey Lewandowski, Political operative and former campaign manager for President Donald Trump
 Matt Mira, Podcast host and comedian 
 Marey Deignan, All American JV Lacrosse Player 

Danny Chasse, NFL Player for the Cleveland Browns
 Sophia J Mishol(owski), TRISPORT ATHLETE/OLYMPIAN

Melissa Alves, Class of 2023 Valedictorian

References

External links

Lowell Catholic High School

Schools sponsored by the Xaverian Brothers
Catholic secondary schools in Massachusetts
Schools in Lowell, Massachusetts
1989 establishments in Massachusetts
Educational institutions established in 1989